Ian Kelsey (born 17 December 1966) is an English actor. He is known for his roles as Dave Glover in the ITV soap opera Emmerdale, Patrick Spiller in the BBC medical drama Casualty, DI Richard Mayne in the ITV crime drama Blue Murder and Howard Bellamy in the BBC soap opera Doctors. As well as appearing in the BBC drama Down to Earth, he also portrayed the role of Vinny Ashford in the ITV soap opera Coronation Street from 2016 to 2017.

Early life
Kelsey was born on 17 December 1966 in York. Prior to acting, Kelsey started his working life as an apprentice coach builder at York railway carriage works. He then trained at the Joseph Rowntree Theatre in York, later graduating from the Guildford School of Acting.

Career
In 1994, Kelsey was cast in the ITV soap opera Emmerdale as a series regular. He made his first appearance as Dave Glover in August 1994. Two years later, it was announced that he would be departing from the soap; he made his final appearance in January 1997. He joined BBC medical drama Casualty in 1999 as Patrick Spiller, in which he appeared until 2002. He then appeared in the BBC drama Down to Earth as Matt Brewer from 2003 to 2004. Kelsey then portrayed the role of DI Richard Mayne in the crime drama Blue Murder for six years.

On 3 September 2010, he guest starred in the BBC soap opera Doctors. Two years later, it was announced that Kelsey would be joining Doctors as new series regular Howard Bellamy. He made his first appearance on 28 May 2012. Kelsey left the medical drama on screen on 22 October 2015, to join Patrick Robinson in the UK touring stage production tour of The Shawshank Redemption. Kelsey joined Coronation Street in August 2016 playing the part of Vinny Ashford, a role he played until 2017.

Filmography

Stage

Awards and nominations

References

External links
 

1966 births
Alumni of the Guildford School of Acting
English male film actors
English male stage actors
English male television actors
Living people
Male actors from York